Yuri Alekseyevich Novikov (born 19 May 1972) is a former Kazakh football goalkeeper. He retired from football at the end of 2007. He is a goalkeeper coach at FC Tobol currently in the Kazakhstan Super League. He has also played for the Kazakhstan national football team, making his debut in 2001.
Novikov started and spent most of his career in Pavlodar, Kazakhstan, where he played in local team "Irtysh" (formerly called "Traktor", "Ansat"). He made his debut in 1990. He also played for FC Shakhter Karagandy.

Novikov was named as the best goalkeeper in the Kazakhstan Super League for the seasons 2001, 2002, 2003 Moreover, Novikov was named Kazakhstani Footballer of the Year by journal GOAL in 2003.

References

External links
  FC Tobol staff list

Living people
1972 births
Association football goalkeepers
Kazakhstani footballers
Kazakhstan international footballers
Kazakhstan Premier League players
FC Irtysh Pavlodar players
FC Shakhter Karagandy players
FC Zhetysu players